Haya bint Abdulaziz Al Saud (1929 – 2 November 2009) was a member of the House of Saud.

Early life
Princess Haya was born in 1929. She was a daughter of King Abdulaziz and Mudhi who was an Armenian woman. Haya bint Abdulaziz was the second oldest of their four children. She had three full siblings: an older sister, Princess Sultana, and two younger brothers, Prince Majid and Prince Sattam who is the former governor of Riyadh Province.

Activities
Haya bint Abdulaziz became the patron of the Saudi Cricket Centre in 2001 which is the governing body of cricket in Saudi Arabia.

Personal life
Haya bint Abdulaziz married Muhammad bin Saud bin Abdul Rahman Al Saud, a nephew of King Abdulaziz. They have four children; a daughter, Noura and three sons, Saad, Faisal and Abdul Rahman.

Death and funeral
Haya bint Abdulaziz died of an illness at the King Faisal Specialist Hospital in Riyadh on 2 November 2009. She was 80 years old. Her funeral prayers was held at the Imam Turki bin Abdullah Mosque in Riyadh on 3 November 2009. King Abdullah attended her funeral prayers with other officials and dignitaries. Prince Fahd bin Mohammed bin Abdulaziz, Prince Mutaib bin Abdulaziz, Prince Bandar bin Mohammad bin Abdul Rahman, then Deputy Chief of the National Guard Prince Badr bin Abdulaziz, Prince Abdul Rahman bin Abdullah bin Abdul Rahman, Makkah Governor Prince Khalid Al Faisal bin Abdulaziz, then Deputy Interior Minister Prince Ahmed bin Abdulaziz and then Chief of General Intelligence Prince Miqren bin Abdulaziz also performed funeral prayers for her.

Ancestry

References

Haya
Haya
1929 births
2009 deaths
Haya
Haya